Byun Jin-sub (born May 19, 1966) is a South Korean singer.

Discography

Studio albums

References

External links

1966 births
Living people
Blues singers
Grand Prize Seoul Music Award recipients
South Korean male singers
South Korean pop singers
South Korean singer-songwriters
South Korean television personalities
Place of birth missing (living people)
Chogye Byeon clan
South Korean male singer-songwriters